The Ashlee Simpson Show is a television reality show about the life of Ashlee Simpson. The first season, taped from late 2003 to mid-2004, focused on the beginnings of her career as a singer and the recording of her debut album, Autobiography. A second season, taped from late 2004 to early 2005, focused on her career after the album's release.

Consisting of eight half-hour episodes, the first season ran on MTV in the U.S. in the summer of 2004. The show proved quite successful and helped to establish widespread recognition for Simpson, whose album was released on July 20, 2004, a month after the show began airing, and debuted at number one in sales. Jordan Schur, the president of Simpson's record label, Geffen, said that "There's no question that it really helped expose her and her music. She's got a tremendous personality; people gravitate toward that. They want to watch her and listen to her music." The second and final season, consisting of ten episodes, aired in early 2005.

Series overview

The show consists of pseudo-reality footage interspersed with clips of Simpson talking to the camera about herself and about the various events in the show. It begins with Simpson signing her record deal with Geffen; the first season ends with the U.S. release of her album, and the second season ends with the launch of her first tour. Simpson's song "Autobiography", the title track from her album, plays during the show's opening, which is composed of clips of Simpson from the show mixed with brightly colored backgrounds and handwritten lyrics, words and scribblings. The first season's opening includes only clips of Simpson with blonde hair, while the second season's opening starts with blonde clips and eventually progresses to clips of Simpson with dark hair, reflecting Simpson's change of hair color halfway through the first season.

Season 1
Much of the show deals with the process of writing and recording songs. Episode one shows some of the early stages of songwriting, and in episode two Simpson records some demos which are not received favorably by Schur. He wants Simpson to work with other people, and she is seen meeting with several in episode three: John Feldmann of the band Goldfinger, Guy Chambers, and the producing team The Matrix. Later in the same episode, Simpson first works with John Shanks, who became the producer of Autobiography, and who had previously worked with Alanis Morissette, Sheryl Crow, and Michelle Branch. Simpson and Shanks work together on a song called "Surrender", which Simpson says they wrote in about two hours and calls a "great song"; later, however, Simpson becomes upset because she thinks Schur wants the song to have more of a "pop" sound. She is told by Thom Panunzio that Schur thinks she should sound "prettier", although at the same time Panunzio tells her that it's "probably good" that Schur compared what he heard to the music of the band Garbage. Throughout the show, Simpson expresses her preference for rock music and that she wants her album to reflect that; she says she does not want her album to sound like the pop music of Hilary Duff or her sister Jessica. At one point, when she is very upset after talking with Panunzio, she says that she would rather not have a record than do that kind of music. However, Simpson and her father Joe Simpson (who is also her manager) subsequently discuss the matter with Schur, and things are worked out.

The recording of "Pieces of Me", the album's first single, features in episode four, and Simpson works with Kara DioGuardi. The show displays the difficulties that Simpson faces in recording her album; as she says at one point, "It's hard in the recording studio to make sure my vocals are good and to get all the right harmonies". She has emphasized that the process of recording is seen as it really is: "...I show lots of imperfections. People will see me in the studio for days when it's not going so great. Usually when you watch the making of an album it's like, "Oh yeah! I'm doing my album and it's perfect!" But on my MTV show you can see me trying to sing on the days when I can't hit those notes."

In episode five, Simpson's backing band is formed and they begin to rehearse for live performances, but Simpson begins to have problems with her vocal cords; this makes it difficult for her to sing and causes her a great deal of anxiety. She wonders if her vocal problems will disrupt her music career, and if the reality show will have to be cancelled. She goes to see a doctor, who diagnoses her with acid reflux and a deviated septum and prescribes remedies including vocal rest and changes to her diet. She also has to wear a device in her nose at night. Despite all this, Simpson successfully pulls off her first live performance at the end of episode six, but not without much nervousness beforehand. She stumbles (literally) during her first song, "Autobiography", but her performance of the second song, "La La", an energetic rocker with sexual lyrics, goes much better. She concludes the show with the emotional "Shadow", which later became her album's second single. Backstage after the show, she is congratulated on her performance by everyone from her father to her boyfriend, musician Ryan Cabrera, to her sister Jessica (who is present despite having just had laser eye surgery, and wearing goggles as a result — the eye surgery is featured in an episode of Newlyweds).

Another aspect to the show is Simpson's personal life. Much of the first episode deals with her relationship with her boyfriend, Josh Henderson; the two seem very affectionate, and Simpson says in her car that she likes to wonder what Josh is thinking about and then turn to a radio station to get an answer from a random song — for example, she asks, "Is Josh having fun tonight?" and a song on the radio replies "Yeah!", and she laughs. As it turns out, though, immediately after this the two break up — apparently at Josh's instigation. By episode three, Simpson begins a new relationship with Ryan Cabrera and appears in his music video for "On the Way Down". At first he was just a friend (he lived in her house with her family for about a year and a half, she says), but romance between them is seen beginning during the filming of the video. At one point in the filming, she pushes Cabrera against a wall and starts kissing him ("He was in so much shock", she says). "I was like a little nervous because he's like my dorky brother that I go rollerblading with, and all that kind of stuff," she says, "but after that, you know, it kind of like, broke the barrier." Later, as they are kissing for a shot that constitutes the ending of the video, they continue kissing even after the filming is over. In episode four, Cabrera disappoints Simpson on Valentine's Day by not playing a song he wrote for her at a concert, and Simpson says that he's the worst Valentine ever: not only did he not give her a single flower, she tells him, he didn't even give her a dying flower. But as it turns out, he did get flowers for her after all, and she realizes, with some embarrassment, that she "blew it up out of proportion so bad".

The show ties her music together with her personal life in that many of the songs are inspired by events in her personal life, both good and bad: "Pieces of Me" was inspired by Ryan, "Unreachable" was inspired by Josh, and "Shadow" is about the feeling she had when she was younger of being in the shadow of her sister, and about emerging from that shadow and finding her identity.

Aside from music and romance, the show also chronicles minor but often humorous tribulations of Simpson's life: for example, in episode two she locks her keys in her car, and in episode three she is revealed to be chronically late and she gets lost despite her car having a navigational system, which seems to be of little help. In episode six, she is late again — through no fault of her own, though, since her mother was driving — this time for her first show. (She arrives in time for the performance itself, but doesn't get as much time for rehearsal as had been intended.)

In episode four, Simpson goes to a ballet class with a friend because she wants to get in shape, but she and her friend can't help laughing through the class; eventually she concludes that she'll have to find some other way to get her workout, even though she was a dancer for years and was admitted to the School of American Ballet at the young age of 11. "Shadow" is introduced at the beginning of episode five, when she talks with John Shanks about the song and then begins to sing it while Shanks plays guitar; this segues into a series of video clips of Simpson's life from her childhood up to the present day, and while these play, Simpson talks about growing up in Texas and being a dancer. Later in the episode, after a photoshoot (which she describes as her first "as an artist"), she dyes her previously blonde hair dark, but says she did not do it to distinguish herself from her sister, who is blonde. At the beginning of episode six, in the midst of her problems with her voice, she films a Pizza Hut commercial with Jessica; she becomes upset because Jessica wears a sexy outfit in the commercial while she is made to look more drab and "like a boy" by comparison. She mocks the situation by deepening her voice in a humorous way and saying, "Jessica, buffalos don't have wings" — the commercial's joke refers to Jessica's mistake in thinking that buffalos have wings, in an episode from the first season of Newlyweds.

In episode seven, she poses for the photoshoot for her album; some of the pictures from the photoshoot, such as those used for the front and back album cover, feature Simpson in a dark setting with graffiti-style writing scrawled behind her, while other shots show her posing with a microphone in front of a white background. In the same episode, she records the video for her second single, "Shadow", in which she plays two different versions of herself, blonde and brunette; at one point in the filming, her blonde wig slips off, and everyone laughs, including her. Simpson also gives two live performances in episode seven. She is dissatisfied with the first of these, in which she sings "Pieces of Me" at Summer Music Mania 2004 in May; Jessica introduces her to the crowd and enthusiastically enjoys the performance, but Ashlee herself is left hoping that her next performance will go better. Another performance at the end of the episode goes well; Simpson sings "La La" and is congratulated by Jordan Schur. Episode eight begins with a performance of "Pieces of Me" on The Tonight Show with Jay Leno in May, and she appears on MTV's Total Request Live to promote her album on July 20, the day of its U.S. release. At TRL, she talks with P. Diddy, who asks her for an autograph, and causes herself much embarrassment when she, upon meeting the rapper Jay-Z, tells him that she loves his song; when Jay-Z asks which song, she begins rapping a line from his song "99 Problems", which makes her feel foolish, and she laughs at herself about it. Also in episode eight, she visits Target House in Memphis, Tennessee, a place for children with suppressed immune systems, and sings "Pieces of Me" for the children. The last episode ends with Simpson going on stage to sing at the Mall of America in Minnesota, followed by a montage of clips from the show as the song "Autobiography" plays, with the clips often corresponding to the lyrics in some way.

Simpson's parents, Joe and Tina, appear frequently on the show. Her sister Jessica also makes a number of appearances, although not as many. Simpson has said that she was initially reluctant to do a reality show when her father approached her with the idea: "...I saw how the cameras were always around my sister. It seemed so hectic and crazy, and I was sure I wasn't ready to deal with that." She was, however, persuaded when her father said that the show would be about her album and music, which she thought was "kind of cool": "You're actually seeing a deeper look into how this album got made." She also wanted to prevent people from thinking that she was "just like Jessica", so she thought the show "was the smartest way to put an end to the comparisons." She said in one interview: "I chose to do it because it's like a making of the album but at the same time they come into my real life too. And you kind of get to see everything I go through in the process. Sometimes there's stress and sometimes there are these amazing moments."

Simpson described her sister's advice on having a reality show: "She said I'd have to put it all on the table and just be myself, so that's what I've done." She also said that "Having a reality show could be scary, but I don't have anything to hide." In one interview, she referred to the awkwardness of realizing something she just said was filmed. Regarding the camera crews taping her, she has said: "The MTV crew became my close friends so we had a lot of fun."

Season 2
Simpson said initially that she would only do one season of the show, and in an interview with Blender magazine she said: "Jessica may be happy having cameras in her life 24/7, but not me. It's not natural; it ain't healthy." However, she subsequently said that there would be a second season in the future, possibly because of the considerable success of the first season. In an episode of MTV's Making the Video on November 23, which documented the making of Simpson's music video for "La La" (Autobiography's third single) and then premiered it, Simpson mentioned that cameras were there filming for the second season of The Ashlee Simpson Show. On Making the Video, she also said: "It's been really cool having The Ashlee Simpson Show; I had no clue how the first season was gonna turn out whenever they were taping me, and I was really excited because it was something my fans could relate to. So whenever I run into my fans, it feels like, you know, they know me, so it's cool." Later, on February 7, 2005, she mentioned that the second season had started taping on October 1, and that she had two weeks left of taping.

The new season, which dealt with Simpson's life from October 2004 to February 2005, began airing on January 26, 2005. The first episode of the second season dealt with Simpson moving into a new house with her friends Lauren and Stephanie, and with her preparations for her Saturday Night Live performance, which would become an infamous incident — the episode ended with her increasing vocal troubles prior to the performance. According to USA Today, the second-season premiere had about 2.7 million viewers, which it said was a slight 3% gain over the first season's premiere.

The second episode of the season started with the SNL incident and Simpson's embarrassment over her failed performance and the criticism that followed. In the remainder of the episode, she gave more successful performances at the Radio Music Awards and at high schools, and she was happy to see the continued support of her fans despite the negative publicity she received from the SNL incident. She also went trick-or-treating and learned that "La La", not "Autobiography", would be her third single.

The third episode of season two began with Simpson celebrating her 20th birthday (her birthday was on October 3, while the SNL performance took place about three weeks later, so this segment of episode three actually predated the events of the first two episodes), before continuing with Simpson deciding to cut her hair shorter (a decision which her mother was not pleased with) and then filming her video for "La La" and doing a photoshoot for Entertainment Weekly, since she was chosen as one of EWs breakout artists of the year.

The season's fourth episode featured rehearsals and the addition of a new member, Lucy Walsh, to her band to sing backup vocals and play keyboards, as well as a performance of "La La" on TRL (November 18, 2004). She also did some exercises to get in shape, performed at the "Hob Nobble Gobble" and participated in a Thanksgiving parade in Detroit.

The fifth episode of the season included Simpson filming the movie Undiscovered (known during filming as Wannabe, and released in August 2005), having some relationship problems with Cabrera, who she felt was not calling her often enough, and doing radio interviews over the phone — in which she is, as usual, asked about the SNL incident, although she does not like talking about it, as well having to answer some unusual questions during international interviews, such as "have you ever held a live fish?" and "do you like sneezing?" She also does a live show over the Internet for AOL Music Live (December 6, 2004), and receives Billboard's award for best new female artist at the end of the episode, which she considers a positive conclusion to the year.

The sixth episode of the season included Simpson celebrating Christmas with her friends and band, doing some concerts, her ongoing relationship with Cabrera (with its ups and downs), and an incident in which Simpson is pursued by the paparazzi and the police are called.

The seventh episode of the season included Simpson celebrating New Year's Day and going to Miami to sing "La La" at the Orange Bowl halftime show. However, she had to change the lyrics to "La La" due to their sexuality, and she was stressed by having to remember new words to the song. The episode ended in a cliffhanger as she was about to go on stage to sing.

The eighth episode of the season started with the Orange Bowl performance, which did not go well for her. Immediately after the song was finished, the audience could be heard booing in the background on the Orange Bowl broadcast, but this booing did not feature in the actual episode. The episode showed technical issues she faced while performing, including commentary stating that she couldn't hear herself. (The same incident from the perspective of Jessica and Nick featured in the previous week's episode of Newlyweds.) Afterwards she went to Germany and then to the UK, appeared on television a few times (including on Top of the Pops in the UK, where she chose to sing live although that was not typical for the show) and did some radio interviews.

The ninth episode of the season includes Simpson being given a dog by Cabrera (at the end of the episode she reciprocates by giving him a hamster), exercising and working with a vocal coach in preparation for her upcoming tour, and playing a game of hockey with her band members and friends.

The tenth and last episode of the season involved the launch of Simpson's tour. Ashlee and the band try out some new cover songs and a reworked version of "La La". Joe Simpson tells the band not to make any mistakes on the tour, and criticizes the guitar solos. Problems with Ashlee's monitors and mixing make her nervous. The first concert seems to go well, and the episode closes with flashbacks through both seasons.

In March 2005, Simpson said that The Ashlee Simpson Show would not have a third season: "The Ashlee Simpson Show has definitely come to its rest. I don't know how much more you could see of me." She did, however, say she might do some sort of television show in the future. On October 14, 2005, Ashlee Simpson: Live and Legal, a show about Simpson's 21st birthday, aired on MTV, using the same format as The Ashlee Simpson Show.

On The Sharon Osbourne Show in October 2006, Simpson said that she would not be willing to do the show again and that the period of the show's filming was a difficult time in her life that was not helped by the presence of cameras, but that she did not regret doing the show, because she gained many fans who got to know her better through it.

Episodes

Season 1 (2004)
 "Ashlee Moves Onward and Upward" – June 16, 2004
 "Ashlee Verses Her Label" – June 23, 2004
 "Ashlee Rocks Ryan's World" – June 30, 2004
 "Valentine's Bummer" – July 7, 2004
 "Ashlee Strikes a Pose" – July 14, 2004
 "Ashlee Performs Live" – July 21, 2004
 "Ashlee Hits the Big Time" – July 28, 2004
 "Ashlee Goes Platinum" – August 4, 2004

Season 2 (2005)
 "Ashlee Heads to the Big Apple" – January 26, 2005
 "Ashlee's Notorious Performance" – February 2, 2005
 "Ashlee Turns 20" – February 9, 2005
 "Ashlee Backs Up Her Vocals" — February 16, 2005
 "New Female Artist of the Year" – February 23, 2005
 "Jingle Ball Rock" – March 2, 2005
 "Happy New Year!" – March 9, 2005
 "The Orange Bowl" – March 16, 2005
 "Puppy Love" – March 23, 2005
 "The Show Must Go On..." – March 30, 2005

Broadcast
The first season of The Ashlee Simpson Show debuted in the U.S. on June 16, 2004 and aired every Wednesday until the last episode on August 4. The show aired at 10:30 PM ET, the time slot just after Ashlee's sister Jessica Simpson's already successful reality show Newlyweds: Nick and Jessica. The second season of the show, airing in the same time slot as before and again following Newlyweds, began in the U.S. on January 26, 2005 and ended on March 30.

In Canada, the first season of The Ashlee Simpson Show began showing on MTV Canada on July 1, 2004, airing on Thursdays at 9:00 ET; the second season began airing at the same time on February 10, 2005. Also in Canada, the first season began airing on MuchMusic beginning on November 14, 2004 at 4:30 p.m. ET (having been moved up from the previously planned date of November 21). In the United Kingdom, the first episode of the first season aired on MTV UK on September 27, 2004.

References

External links
 
 

2000s American reality television series
2004 American television series debuts
2005 American television series endings
English-language television shows
MTV reality television series
Ashlee Simpson